New Look at New Guinea is an Australian television documentary mini-series which was filmed in 1959. Produced by the Australian Commonwealth Film Unit and aired on ABC, it was a six-part series. The episodes are held by the National Archives of Australia (per a search of their website).

Episode list
 Election Day at Maprik
 Great Day at Goroka
 Big Village
 Missionaries and Coconuts
 Pioneers on Patrol
 Men of Two Worlds

References

External links
New Look at New Guinea on IMDb

1950s Australian documentary television series
1960s Australian documentary television series
1959 Australian television series debuts
1960 Australian television series endings
Australian Broadcasting Corporation original programming
English-language television shows
Black-and-white Australian television shows